Murtaza Nizam Shah III, was a Nizam Shahi boy prince who in the year 1633 became the nominal Sultan of Ahmednagar. He was subjected to the authority of the Mughal Emperor Shah Jahan.

The Maratha Mughal general Sardar Ranoji Wable attacked Ahmednagar killed Fateh Khan along with the boy prince Hussain Nizam Shah III on the order of Mughal Emperor Shah Jahan, his relatives as well as two pregnant women so that there would not be any male heir to the throne. But soon, Shahaji with the assistance of Bijapur Sultanate, placed an infant scion of the Nizam Shahi dynasty, Murtaza on the throne and he became the regent. The scion Nizam and Shahaji's family was stationed in the Mahuli Fort. Shah Jahan quickly made an alliance with Mohammed Adil Shah of Bijapur and the respective Mughal and Adil Shahi generals, Khan Zaman (son of Mahabat Khan) and Ranadulla Khan (father of Rustum-e-Zaman) besieged Mahuli. Shahaji tried to break the siege externally several times but failed. However, the mother of Murtaza Nizam, Sajeeda was caught while fleeing along with the Nizam. Murtaza Nizam Shah III was brought before Shah Jahan and Mohammed Adil Shah. Shah Jahan proposed to murder the boy Nizam so as to finish the Nizam Shahi once and for all but Shahaji intervened and requested Shah Jahan to change his decision. But Mohammed Adil Shah was adamant that he should kill the young prince. After some thinking, Shah Jahan ordered Nizam's release much to the surprise of Mohammed Adil Shah. However, he set a condition that Shahaji would be placed in the deep south so that he could not pose any challenge to the Mughals. The Nizam was taken away by Maratha Sardar Ranoji Wable to Delhi and was made a Sardar.

See also
Nizam Shahi

References

Ahmadnagar Sultanate